José Emílio Robalo Furtado (born 14 March 1983) is a Cape Verdean former footballer who played as a striker. He also holds Portuguese citizenship.

Career
Born in Praia, Cape Verde, Furtado started his football career in Portugal with lowly Casa Pia A.C. in the Lisbon area, where he also made his senior debuts. He moved to FC Porto in 2003, playing one full season with its reserves then moving on loan to another modest club, G.D. Tourizense.

In June 2005, Furtado, still on loan from Porto, signed with Bulgarian team FC Vihren Sandanski, where he scored regularly in the First Professional Football League. In the following January transfer window, he was sold to fellow league side PFC CSKA Sofia for €300.000.

Furtado's spell with the "armymen" also started in a scoring fashion, but eventually ended on a sour note: he fell out with manager Stoycho Mladenov due to disciplinary breaches (being temporarily removed from the squad), and was also involved in a physical confrontation with captain Valentin Iliev, which ultimately led to his return to Portugal.

In the summer of 2007, Furtado moved to the Portuguese Primeira Liga as he signed with F.C. Paços de Ferreira. On 18 August he made his debut in the competition by playing the second half of a 1–3 away loss against C.S. Marítimo, and was relatively used during the campaign in a second-to-last finish with the subsequent relegation – later reinstatement due to Boavista FC's irregularities.

Furtado split 2008–09 with Paços and U.D. Leiria, then moved abroad again, signing for Ionikos F.C. in the Greek second level. In his first year, he finished third in the competition's top scorers list but his team could only rank 15th, the last position before the relegation zone.

In 2010, Furtado signed for PAS Giannina FC, still in Greece and its second division. More of the same happened in the 2011–12 season, with Panachaiki FC.

Note

External links
 
 
 

Onsports stats 

1983 births
Living people
Sportspeople from Praia
Footballers from Santiago, Cape Verde
Cape Verdean footballers
Association football forwards
Primeira Liga players
Liga Portugal 2 players
Segunda Divisão players
Casa Pia A.C. players
FC Porto B players
G.D. Tourizense players
F.C. Paços de Ferreira players
U.D. Leiria players
First Professional Football League (Bulgaria) players
OFC Vihren Sandanski players
PFC CSKA Sofia players
Super League Greece players
Football League (Greece) players
Ionikos F.C. players
PAS Giannina F.C. players
Panachaiki F.C. players
AEK Athens F.C. players
Panegialios F.C. players
Panserraikos F.C. players
Liga I players
ACS Poli Timișoara players
Cypriot First Division players
Anagennisi Deryneia FC players
I liga players
Olimpia Grudziądz players
Cape Verdean expatriate footballers
Expatriate footballers in Portugal
Expatriate footballers in Bulgaria
Expatriate footballers in Greece
Expatriate footballers in Romania
Expatriate footballers in Cyprus
Expatriate footballers in Poland
Cape Verdean expatriate sportspeople in Portugal
Cape Verdean expatriate sportspeople in Bulgaria
Cape Verdean expatriate sportspeople in Greece
Cape Verdean expatriate sportspeople in Romania
Cape Verdean expatriate sportspeople in Cyprus